The Jouët 760 is a French sailboat, that was designed by Philippe Briand.

Production
The boat was built by Yachting France under the Jouët name, between 1982 and 1986, with 150 examples completed, but it is now out of production.

The Jouët 760 design is very similar to the related Jouët 750.

Design

The Jouët 760 is a small recreational keelboat, built predominantly of fiberglass. It has a masthead sloop rig, a transom-hung rudder and a fixed fin keel or optionally a short keel and centreboard. It displaces .

See also
List of sailing boat types

Similar sailboats
Beachcomber 25
Beneteau First 25.7
Beneteau First 25S
Beneteau First 260 Spirit
Bombardier 7.6
C&C 25 Redline
Cal 25
Catalina 25
Catalina 250
Com-Pac 25
Dufour 1800
Freedom 25
Hunter 25.5
Kirby 25
O'Day 25
Merit 25
Mirage 25
MacGregor 25
Northern 25
Tanzer 25
US Yachts US 25
Watkins 25

References

External links

Keelboats
1980s sailboat type designs
Sailing yachts
Sailboat type designs by Philippe Briand
Sailboat types built by Yachting France
Sailboat types built by Jouët